Niko Verekauta (born February 16, 1987 in Kadavu) is a Fiji Islands sprinter.

Biography
He represented Fiji in the 400m sprint at 2006 Commonwealth Games and the 400m sprint at the 2008 Summer Olympics. He also won five gold medals at the Mini South Pacific Games in 2009.

Achievements

Further achievements
2004
Coca-Cola games  2 gold(200meters,400meters) 1 silver (relay)
2005
Coca-Cola Games  2 gold (400m,relay)
2006
Coca-Cola Games  2 gold (400m,relay) 1 silver(200m)
Commonwealth Games 400m Semifinalist, Melbourne, Australia.
World Junior Championship 400m Semifinalist, Beijing, China.
2007
New Zealand Championship 1 bronze(400meters)
Belgium Championship 1 Gold (400meters)
Australia under 23 1 Silver (400meter)
2008
New Zealand Championship 1 Gold (400meters)
Belgium Championship 1 Gold (400meters)
France A league Series 1 Silver (400meters)
Europe 300m A league Placed 4th Overall
Fiji representative to the Olympic Games in Beijing, China.
2009
Under 23 Australian Championship 2 Gold(200m,400m)
Represented Fiji at the World Championship in Berlin,Germany.
Oceania Games in Gold Coast Australia 4 Gold medal(100m,200m both the relays)

References

External links

Sports reference biography

Living people
1987 births
Fijian male sprinters
Athletes (track and field) at the 2006 Commonwealth Games
Commonwealth Games competitors for Fiji
Athletes (track and field) at the 2008 Summer Olympics
Olympic athletes of Fiji
People from Kadavu Province
I-Taukei Fijian people
People educated at Suva Grammar School